Charles Abram Ellwood (January 20, 1873 near Ogdensburg, New York – September 25, 1946) was one of the leading American sociologists of the interwar period, studying intolerance, communication and revolutions and using many multidisciplinary methods. He argued that sociology should play a role in directing cultural evolution through education of society.

Biography
He graduated from Cornell University in 1896 and studied also at the Universities of Chicago and Berlin. For one year he was lecturer and instructor at the University of Nebraska and in 1900 became professor of sociology at the University of Missouri. He became also advisory editor of the American Journal of Sociology and associate editor of the Journal of Criminal Law and Criminology. In 1904 he served as president of the Missouri Confederated Charities. He was the fourteenth president of the American Sociological Association in 1924. He spent the first 30 years of his career and rose to national prominence at the University of Missouri-Columbia before a 15-year tenure at Duke University.

An excerpt from the Missouri University (MU) Sociology Web site reads:

Publications
 Sociology and Modern Social Problems (1910)
 Sociology in its Psychological Aspects (1912; French trans., 1914)
 The Social Problem: A Constructive Analysis (1917)

He also monographs and special articles on social psychology.

Notes

References
 Biography at ASA

External links

 
 
 Sociology and Modern Social Problems at The Online Books Page
 

American sociologists
Revolution theorists
1873 births
1946 deaths
University of Missouri faculty
Duke University faculty
Presidents of the American Sociological Association
Cornell University alumni